On May 16, 2000, an election was held in Portland, Oregon, to elect the mayor.. Incumbent mayor Vera Katz was re-elected to a third term.

Portland uses a nonpartisan system for local elections, in which all voters are eligible to participate. All candidates are listed on the ballot without any political party affiliation. 

All candidates meeting the qualifications competed in a blanket primary election on May 16, 2000. Because Katz received a majority of the vote in the primary, no runoff election in November was necessary.

Results
Katz defeated Jake Oken-Berg, a 19-year-old student and political unknown who received a surprising 27% of the vote and almost forced a runoff, as well as 15 other candidates, who, combined, received approximately 18% of the vote.

References

Mayoral election 2000
2000
2000 Oregon elections
Portland